Ranvik Glacier is a broad glacier flowing into the southern part of Ranvik Bay in the southeast part of Prydz Bay. Mapped by Norwegian cartographers from air photos taken by the Lars Christensen Expedition (1936–37), and named Ranvikbreen (Ranvik Glacier) for its association with Ranvik Bay.

See also
 List of glaciers in the Antarctic
 Glaciology

References
 

Glaciers of Ingrid Christensen Coast